Harmsen is a Dutch patronymic surname, meaning "son of Harm" (a version of Herman). Notable people with the surname include@

Bill Harmsen (1912–2002), American businessman
Daniëlle Harmsen (born 1986), Dutch tennis player
Eelco Martinus ten Harmsen van der Beek (1897–1953), Dutch illustrator
 (1899–1989), German eugenicist who became a founding member of the International Planned Parenthood Federation.
Jessica Harmsen, Australian television presenter
 (born 1966), Dutch chess player
Joris Harmsen (born 1992), Dutch BMX rider
Sallie Harmsen (born 1989), Dutch actress

Dutch-language surnames
Patronymic surnames